The Basketball Association of the Philippines (BAP) was the International Basketball Federation (FIBA) recognized national governing body for basketball in the Philippines. It was recognized by the FIBA in 1936 until 2007 when the Samahang Basketbol ng Pilipinas or SBP was recognized as the new governing body of basketball in the country.

It had sanctioned mostly amateur and minor commercial leagues such as the NCRAA, UCAA, Mindanao Visayas Basketball Association and the National Basketball Conference with the BARECOM as its referees.

Leadership crisis 
The Basketball Association of the Philippines leadership crisis worsened after a lengthy feud between the group of Graham Lim and Tiny Literal and the group of Freddie Jalasco and Lito Puyat in 2001, which resulted in FIBA's suspension of the basketball NSA. The squabble had been going on since 1995.

However, a few months after, FIBA stepped-in and ordered an election that resulted in Literal's victory as the President of the BAP. The suspension was quickly lifted and the Philippines was able to compete in the Southeast Asian Games in Malaysia.

Philippine basketball crisis

In 2005, the BAP-formed Cebuana-Lhuillier Philippine national team, made up of little-known amateur players, lost to the Parañaque Jets, owned by city vice mayor and comedian Anjo Yllana in the 2005 National Basketball Conference pre-season tournament. The Jets were bannered by actors and showbiz personalities, while the BAP team was supposed to have been sent to represent the country in an international tournament. This led to calls from Philippine Olympic Committee President Jose "Peping" Cojuangco to reform the BAP's programs and send a national team made up of professional players from the Philippine Basketball Association.

However, disagreements became bitter in mid-2005 as both groups wanted to have their own groups represent the country to the SEABA Men's Basketball tournament in Malaysia. The BAP also replaced Quintellano "Tiny" Literal with former Philippine senator and Laguna governor Joey Lina as President of the basketball body. As the dispute continued, other National Sports Associations of  the POC expelled the association as the National Sports Association for basketball in the country and created the Philippine Basketball Federation, Inc. as the new basketball governing body. The FIBA, meanwhile, continued to recognize only the BAP and instructed its leaders to sort out the issue.

In July 2005, FIBA suspended the country from all-FIBA sanctioned events, denying an opportunity to defend the SEABA crown, a qualifying round for the FIBA Asian Championships.

Talks of unity would resurface as major basketball stakeholders the PBA, PBL, UAAP and NCAA and Joey Lina, then-BAP President to represent the BAP to form another new association, which materialized in March 2006, and was eventually known as Pilipinas Basketball.

However, the talks stalled when Lina backed out from the formation of the group. It was reported that several members of the BAP were not willing to cooperate with the limited power sharing with Pilipinas Basketball. Pilipinas Basketball tried its luck to gain FIBA recognition from FIBA Secretary-General Patrick Baumann but was denied, urging them to "keep the course".

After another dispute between POC and Lina in forming Pilipinas Basketball in March 2006, both groups agreed to a joint communique to form a new cage body, later named as the Samahang Basketbol ng Pilipinas, in order to resolve the conflict.

However, resurfaced disagreements led to Lina quitting as BAP head after 1½ years at the helm, claiming POC's intervention in the formation of the SBP. Secretary-General Graham Lim also resigned in the SBP Board.

After Lina's resignation, Philippine senator Jinggoy Estrada, son of former Philippine president Joseph Estrada, became the new president of the BAP. One of the first moves he tried to make was to request for the padlocked BAP office at the Philippine Sports Commission building to be reopened and to convince the POC to reinstate the BAP. However, those requests were denied, but Estrada was given explanation by POC President Jose Cojuangco about the reasons for the BAP expulsion.

Estrada would later work with the SBP on an agreement to unify the two organizations. The BAP board became irate and fired Estrada as its president. Once again, several members of the BAP were not willing to cooperate with the limited power sharing with the SBP. Estrada stayed with the SBP as a special consultant. Philippine Amateur Track and Field Association president Go Teng Kok was named as the association's interim president.

FIBA Secretary-General Patrick Baumann, however, fast-tracked the form the SBP, saying that the BAP cannot back out of the "Joint Communique" which stated that the BAP had to cooperate, and be merged with Pilipinas Basketball to form the SBP.

The association was intended to be dissolved and merged with Pilipinas Basketball to form a new basketball body. On February 5, 2007, the Samahang Basketbol ng Pilipinas which is intended to be a merger of the two.

BAP remains an extant organization and is a member of the Federation of School Sports Association of the Philippines.

Criticisms
In its final two decades, observers criticized the said association for sending weak basketball teams in international competitions. It became evident when the country placed 15th out of 16 teams in the 2003 FIBA Asia Championships, their lowest ever finish in the tournament. Outrage against officials such as Secretary-General Graham Lim also became prevalent, as it is believed that he had much to do with the sending of the weak teams, while using politics to keep himself in power of the BAP. Leadership squabbles were not an uncommon occurrence, the most notable of which was one that split the association in two, stemming from the BAP elections on August 14, 1995.

It was also criticized back in the 1970s by team owners of the Manila Industrial and Commercial Athletic Association for its rough treatment of some member teams. This led to 10 companies bolting out of the league in favor of forming the Philippine Basketball Association in 1975.

Presidents
Ambrosio Padilla (1936–68)
Gonzalo Puyat II (1968–93)
Freddie Jalasco (1993–2001)
Tiny Literal (2001–05)
Joey Lina (2005–06)
Jinggoy Estrada (2006–07)
Go Teng Kok (2007–11)
Antonio Trillanes IV (2011–2016)
Robert Milton Calo (2016–present)

References

External links
 Old BAP profile at Gov.ph website

Sports organizations established in 1936
Organizations disestablished in 2007
Basketball governing bodies in the Philippines